Prashant Awasthi (born 4 November 1998) is a Nepalese professional footballer who plays as a midfielder for Martyr's Memorial A-Division League club Satdobato Youth Club and the Nepal national team. He made his international national debut against Thailand on 24 March 2022 in Chonburi.

Club career
In 2020, Awasthi made out of the Khumaltar Youth Club his professional debut in the 2020–21 Martyr's Memorial B-Division League (Second-tier league of Nepal).
   
In 2021, Awasthi was signed by newly promoted Satdobato Youth Club. He made his first-tier debut in Satdobato Youth Club against Friends Club in November 19.

International career
In 2022, Awasthi was called-up in the Nepal national football team for a Thailand tour. On 24 March 2022, he made his debut official international against Thailand in 72nd minutes.

Career Statistics

Club

External links

 Nepal90 profile

References

1998 births
Living people
Nepalese footballers
Nepal youth international footballers
Nepal international footballers
Association football midfielders